Donald Hansen may refer to:
Donald Hansen (1924–1981), Canadian politician from Alberta
Don Hansen (born 1944), American football linebacker
Donald Hanson (1926–2012), American politician from Iowa